The Port of Tarifa is a commercial harbor for fishing and passenger boats, located in the Andalusian town of Tarifa. It is managed by the Port Authority of Algeciras and is the closest European port to North Africa and on the main shipping route to Tangier in Morocco and Ceuta. It has a length of 25 metres, and depth of 50 metres.

History
In May 429 A.D. the port was the gathering point of Geiseric and his Vandal army as they made their way to plunder in Africa.

References

Buildings and structures in Tarifa
Ports and harbours of Spain